The 22671/22672 Chennai Egmore–Madurai Junction Tejas Express is India's second semi-high speed Tejas Express introduced by Indian Railways connecting  and  in Tamil Nadu, after Mumbai CSMT–Karmali Tejas Express. It is currently being operated with 22671/22672 train numbers on six days a week basis. At present, it is the only Tejas Express running in Tamil Nadu as well as in Entire South India.

Coach composition 

The 22671/22672 Chennai Egmore–Madurai Junction Tejas Express presently has 1 AC Executive Chair Car, 12 AC Chair Car coaches along with 2 End-on Generator coaches.

As with most train services in India, coach composition may be amended at the discretion of Indian Railways depending on demand.

Service

22671/22672 Chennai Egmore–Madurai Junction Tejas Express currently operates 6 days a week, covering 493 km in 6 hrs 15 mins (79 km/hr average speed). Max speed is 110 kmph.

Schedule 
22671 TEJAS EXPRESS departs (except Thursday) Chennai Egmore at 06:00 IST (06:00 AM), reaches  at 09:55 IST (09:55 AM), then  at 11:03 IST (11:03 AM) and reaches its destination Madurai Junction at 12:15 IST (12:15 PM)
22672 TEJAS EXPRESS departs (except Thursday) Madurai Junction at 15:00 IST (03:00 PM), then  at 15:45 IST (03:45 PM) then  at 17:00 IST (05:00 PM) and reaches its destination Chennai Egmore at 21:15 IST (09:15 PM)

Route & halts 

The halts of the train are:

 
  (New Stoppage Granted W.E.F. 26-Feb-2023)
 
  (Stoppage provided instead of  W.E.F. 02-April-2022)

Traction

Both trains are hauled by a Royapuram-based WAP-7 locomotive on its entire journey.

See also 
Vande Bharat Express 
Humsafar Express
Antyodya Express
Tejas Express
Uday Express

References 

Tejas Express trains
Rail transport in Tamil Nadu
Transport in Chennai
Transport in Madurai
Railway services introduced in 2019